To Love and Back EP is a six-track EP that was released on Action Theory Records on June 12, 2009, by This Century, a pop rock band from Phoenix, Arizona.

Track listing

Personnel
Members
 Joel Kanitz – vocals
 Sean Silverman – lead guitar
 Alex Silverman – bass guitar, keyboard
 Ryan Gose – drums

References

External links 
 

2009 EPs